Rekha Pande (born 6 June)  is a professor of history and women’s studies. She is  a professor emeritus at the Henry Martin Institute, an International Centre for Research, Interfaith Relations and Reconciliation, Hyderabad. She is also currently the director of SEED, Society for Empowerment through Environment Development. She is the former director of the Centre for Women's Studies and a professor of history in the University of Hyderabad, India.  She is a well-known and well published scholar in the inter-disciplinary areas of history and women's studies. She is an established academician in the field of international studies, women's history and gender studies.  As a feminist historian she has been concerned with the theoretical and methodological problems of reconstructing women's history and in understanding the historical roots of women's subordination in the South Asian context. She also attempts to examine the varied historical contexts at the regional/local levels and explain the reproduction and subordination of women at the national and global scale—in a variety of related, albeit different, contemporary contexts. She has been an academic activist also associated with the women's movement in India.

Early life and education 
Rekha Pande was born in Uttrakhand in the Himalayan valleys.  Her earlier schooling was in different parts of the country. She studied at Holy Family High School and Kendriya Vidyalaya. She did her graduation in the University of Allahabad, studying history, English literature and political science. In her post graduation she studied history and went on to obtain a PhD from Allahabad University.

Career 
Rekha Pande has a teaching experience in three different universities: Allahabad University, Maulana Azad National Urdu University and University of Hyderabad. She has also taught a course on religious and cultural heritage of India for four years at the International Institute of Information technology. She is a professor of history and taught in the department of history. She the former head of the department in the Centre for Women's Studies at the University of Hyderabad.  Prior to this she was the head of the department of history. She been the founding member of two centers for women's studies, one at Maulana Azad National Urdu University and the other at the University of Hyderabad. She was the chair of the Women’s World Congress in 2014 organized for the first time in India.

Contributions 
She has a large amount of experience working with the National Government, State Government and Non Government Organizations and International Organizations. A historical sensibility and a combination of two major perspectives-cultural studies and feminism, influences her work which covers diverse areas such as social movements, gender construction, religious and cultural aspects and women's movements in India. She is also an active interlocutor of teaching and learning practices, its reconstitution within the classroom, university structures and through national and international professional bodies. In 2019, she has been invited by the National Commission for women, New Delhi, as a National Resource Person for its Gender sensitisation and Gender Development programmes.

Pande's various single-authored and edited books, numerous articles, shows her feminist research orientations to explore multiple aspects of women's issues and the cultural history of women. She has to her credit twenty two  books, most important being, "Divine Sounds from the Heart, Singing unfettered in their own voices-The Bhakti Movement and its Women saints (12th to 17th century)", 2020,  Devdasis in South India – a Journey from sacred to profane spaces, 2017, Sex Trafficking in South Asia with a Special Focus on India, 2016, Women’s Studies Narratives: travails and Triumphs, (ed), 2015, Gender Lens: Women’s issues and Perspectives, (ed), 2015, Journey’s into women’s studies- crossing interdisciplinary Boundaries, (ed), 2014, Globalization, Technology Diffusion and Gender Disparity: Social Impacts of ICTs, 2012, (ed) with Theo P. van der Weide, Divine sounds from the Heart, 2010, Women in Nation Building- A Multi-dimensional perspective (ed) 2007, Religious Reform movement in Medieval India, 2005, Gender issues in the Police, 2000,  Child Labour in the Beedi industry, 1998, and Succession Struggle in the Delhi Sultanate, 1990 . She received the "Visiting Fellowship", Birkbeck Institute of Humanities, University of London, International Visiting Fellowship in the School of Policy Studies, in the University of Bristol, U.K. Academic Fellow, University of Buffalo, USA and International Visiting Scholar, at Maison De Research, Paris and Visiting Professorship at the University of Artois, Arras, France.

Pande has been the National Core Group member of Mahila Samkhya Programme (Women's empowerment), Government of India. As part of this programme, she was the Executive Council member of the Mahila Samakhya programme in Uttrakhand,  Andhra Pradesh, Gujarat in the first term and in Uttar Pradesh, Jharkhand and Bihar during the second term. She has been a member of the Feminist Jurisprudence Committee, National Commission for Women. She was also appointed as the Core Advisory Group member for Sensitization and capacity building towards Eliminating child labor, in the Government of Andhra Pradesh. She has been nominated as the Peace Ambassador’ for the South Asia region by the International Women's Peace Group, Korea in 2016.  She also served as a National Resource Person for the University Grants Commission (UGC) for Capacity Building of Women Managers in Higher Education. She is also actively involved with SEED, The Society for Empowerment through Environment Development. She has been involved with working on the issue of violence. She also pays attention to feminization of technology. She was invited as an Erudite Scholar by the Kerala Government for Gender sensitization and research on Gender issues. The Erudite is one of the innovative concepts undertaken by the State Government of Kerala to rejuvenate the field of higher education in the state and to strengthen research activities of various universities of Kerala. She continues to be involved with the International FeministJournal of Politics, published by Taylor and Francis, Routledge. Some of the areas that she focuses on includes, girl child, Gender violence and Globalisation. Her intellectual effort in academia, professional service, and activism has been to transgress and bridge borders key among them being between disciplines, periods, theory- praxis, and between the Global South and North.

Publications 
I. Books:
 Pande, Rekha, 2023, Women’s work in the Unorganised sector: Issues of Exploitation and Globalisation in the Beedi Industry, Routledge.
pande, Rekha ( with Goel, A.K.Ravulapali Madhavi, Zarina Parveen),   2023,Telangana Land and People, From 1323 to 1724 CE, Vol. II, Dr. MCR Human Resource Development Institute, SARS Foundation, Bookline Publication, Hyderabad.   
 Pande, Rekha ( with Goel, A.K, D.Satyanarayana, Ravulapali Madhavi), 2022, Telangana Land and People , From Stone Age to 1323 CE. Vol.1, Dr. MCR Human Resource Development Institute, SARS Foundation, Bookline Publication, Hyderabad.  
Pande, Rekha, 2020, Divine Sounds from the Heart, Singing unfettered in their own voices-The Bhakti Movement and its Women saints (12th to 17th century), Paper back, Cambridge Scholars Publishing, U.K. 
Pande, Rekha (with S.Jeevanandam), 2017,  Devdasis in South India – a Journey from sacred to profane spaces, Kalpaz Publications, Gyan Books, New Delhi .
 Pande, Rekha, 2016, Sex Trafficking in South Asia with a Special Focus on India, Kalpaz Publication, Gyan Books, New Delhi.
 Pande, Rekha, 2010, Divine Sounds from the Heart, Singing unfettered in their own voices-The Bhakti Movement and its Women saints (12th to 17th century), Cambridge Scholars Publishing, U.K.
 Pande, Rekha, 2005, Religious Movements in Medieval India, Gyan Publishing House, New Delhi.
 Pande, Rekha, 2000, (with Subhash Joshi), Gender Issues in the Police, S.V.P. National Police Academy, Hyderabad. 
 Pande, Rekha, 1998, Child Labour in Beedi Industry, Delta Publishers, Hyderabad.
 Pande, Rekha, 1990, Succession in the Delhi Sultanate, Common Wealth Publications, New Delhi.
II. Edited Books:
Pande, Rekha, (with Sita Vanka, S. Jeevanandam), (eds),  2020, Gender and Globalisation, Rawat Publications, Jaipur.
Pande, Rekha ( with Sita Vanka), ( eds),  2020 , Gender  violence : International perspectives, Rawat Publications, Jaipur.
 Pande, Rekha (with Sita Vanka), (eds),  2019, Genderand structural violence, Rawat Publications, Jaipur. 
Pande, Rekha (with Sita Vanka), (eds),  2019, Gender, Law and Health: International Perspectives, Rawat Publications, Jaipur.
Pande, Rekha (with Sita Vanka and Bharat Chillakuri, eds),  2019, Gender and Work: International Perspectives, Rawat Publications, Jaipur.
 Pande, Rekha (with Th.P. van der Weide, ed), 2018, Handbook of Research on Multicultural Perspectives on Gender and Aging (Advances in Human and Social Aspects of Technology Series), IGI Global; Hershey, Pennsylvania,  USA.
 Pande, Rekha (ed), 2018, Gender and History, Rawat Publication, Jaipur.
 Pande, Rekha (ed), 2016, Women's Studies Narratives: travails and Triumphs, The Women Press, New Delhi.
 Pande, Rekha (ed), 2015, Gender Lens: Women's issues and Perspectives,  Rawat Publication, New Delhi.
 Pande, Rekha (ed), 2014, Journey's into women's studies- crossing interdisciplinary Boundaries, Palgrave Macmillan Press, U, K.
 Pande Rekha (with Theo P. van der Weide) ed. 2012,  Globalization, Technology Diffusion and Gender Disparity: Social Impacts of ICTs Information Science Reference,  IGI Global, Hershey USA.
 Pande Rekha (with Shivkumar Nalini and Mahalingam, Rema, ed), 2007, Women in Nation Building- A Multi dimensional perspective, Panchajanya Publications, Hyderabad.

III. Selected Articles in Books:
 Pande, Rekha, 2022,” Razia Sultan: The First Woman Ruler of the Delhi Sultanate”, in Apostles of Transformation, Anthology of Muslim Women Trailblazers in India ( eds), Akhtarul Wasey and Juhi Gupta . Peter Lang Oxford, New York, pp. 177-198.  
 Pande, Rekha, 2021, Globalisation and Commercial sexual exploitation of women’s bodies in India, in  Elisha Jasper Dung & Augustine  Avwunudioba ( ed),  Human Trafficking: Global History and Perspectives. Lexington Books. An Imprint of Rowman and Littlefield, New York,  London , pp. 53-79.  
 Pande, Rekha (with Wen liu, and Hsunhui Tseng), 2020, Feminist Theory and Methodologies Crossing Disciplinary Boundaries,  Fanny M. Cheung and Diane F. Halpern (Ed), The Cambridge Handbook of the International Psychology of WomenU.K. Cambridge University Press, pp. 14–26. 
 Pande, Rekha, 2019, “Emergence of grass root leadership among women in the fight against Arrack (Liquor)”, The Time is Now: Feminist Leadership for a New Era: (Eds),  Araceli Alonso and Teresa Langle de Paz, The Global Network UNESCO Chairs on Gender Collaboration, Communication and innovation in gender research and practices,   University of Wisconsin-Madison. pp. 86–93. 
 Pande, Rekha, 2018,” The forgotten widows of Vrindawan”, in Pande, Rekha and Th.P. van der Weide (ed),  Handbook of Research on Multicultural Perspectives on Gender and Aging (Advances in Human and Social Aspects of Technology Series), IGI Global, Hershey, Pennsylvania,  USA, pp. 200–216.
 Pande, Rekha, 2018, “Role of Women in the early environment Movements in India”, in Narratives of Environmental Challenges in Brazil and India: Losing Nature, Zélia M.Bora & Murali Sivaramakrishnan, (eds), Lexington Books,  Lanham, Boulder, New York, London.
Pande, Rekha, 2017,  India: Madrasas an Enduring Space for Muslim Girls Education, in Education in South Asia and the Indian Ocean Islands, Edited by Hema Letchamanan and Debotri Dhar, Bloomsbury Academic, Bloomsbury Publishing, Oxford, New York, pp. 107–133.
Pande, Rekha, 2017, Being Eunuch, the Violence Faced by Hijra's Involved in Sex Work— A case study,  Marginalities in India : Themes and Perspectives, Edited by, Asmita Bhattacharyya and Sudeep Basu, Singapore, Springer Nature, pp. 207–228.
 Pande, Rekha (Varun Pande, Theo van der Weide), 2016, Computer games and the reinforcement of gender gaps, in Steans, Jill and Daniela Tepe-Belfrage,  (Eds.) Handbook of Gender in World Politics, Oxford: Edward Elgar, pp. 333–344.
 Pande, Rekha, 2016, My intellectual autobiography and the discovery of women's Studies, in Pande, Rekha (ed), 2016,   Women's Studies Narratives: travails and Triumphs, The Women Press, New Delhi. pp. 285–317.
 Pande, Rekha, 2014, "’My tryst with women’s studies, Pande, Rekha (ed), 2014,  Journey’s into women’s studies- crossing interdisciplinary Boundaries, Palgrave Macmillan Press, U.K.  pp. 101-121.
 Pande, Rekha, 2014, Human Security, Globalization, and Trafficking of Women and Children "in South Asia",  in, Globalization, Development and Security in Asia, (ed) Zhquin Zhu, Foreign Policy and Security in an Asian Century: Threats, strategies and Policy choices, Vol 1, (ed), Benny The Cheng Guan,  World Scientific. Hackensack, N.J. U.S.A.  pp. 277–296.
 Pande Rekha, 2012, Gender Gaps and Information and Communication Technology :A case study of India, in Pande Rekha (with Theo P. van der Weide) ed. 2012,        Globalization, Technology Diffusion and Gender Disparity: Social Impacts of ICTs, Information Science Reference,  IGI Global, Hershey USA. pp. 271–291.
 Pande, Rekha, 2010, Gender issues in South Asia, with special reference to India, Challenges in the new Millennium, in Family in Development, Hopes and Challenges, (Eds), Simon Polinder, Evert Jan Brouwer and Hank Jochesen, Just development Series, Prisma, Shaker Publishing, Netherlands, pp. 47–58.
 Pande, Rekha, 2008, "Ritualized Prostitution: Devdasis to Jogins- A few case studies", in Prostitution and Beyond, An analysis of sex work in India (eds), Rohini Sahni, V. Kalya Shnkar and Hemant Apte, Sage Publications, New Delhi, pp. 101– 117.
 Pande, Rekha, 2008, Digital Divide and Gender in India,  in, Global Information technologies, Concepts, Methodologies, Tools and applications, (ed) Felix B. Tan, Information Science Reference, IGI Global, Hershey, New York, USA.  Chapter 4.8,  pp. 1440–1450.
 Pande, Rekha (K. C. Bindu and Viqar Atiya) 2007, "Remade womanhoods, Refashioned Modernities: The construction of Good woman hood in Annisa an Early 20th Century Women’s Magazine in Urdu", in New Readings in the Literature of British India- C.1780-1947,  ed, Shafquat Towheed,  Ibedem- Verlag, Stuttgart, Germany, pp. 147–172.
 Pande, Rekha, 2006, Virshaivism, in J.S. Grewal (ed), Religious Movements and Institutions in Medieval India, Vol. VII, Part, 2. in D.P. Chattopadhyay (general editor), History of Science, Philosophy and Culture in Indian Civilization, Oxford University Press, New Delhi, pp. 66–80.
 Pande, Rekha, 2006, Digital divide, gender and the India experience in IT,  Vol. 1, Encyclopedia of Gender and Information Technology, (ed) Eileen M. Trauth, Pennsylvania State University, IGI Global, USA. pp. 191– 199.
 Pande Rekha, 2005, Solidarity, Patriarchy and empowerment- Women's struggle against arrack in India,  in Luciana Ricciutelli, Angela Miles, Margaret M.Mcfadden (ed) Feminist Politics, Activism and Vision,- Local and Global Challenges, ed. Zed Publications, New York, pp. 212–226.
 Pande, Rekha, 2004, Engendering University Curricula and teaching Women's Studies in India- a critical evaluation, in The indigenization of Women's Studies Teaching- The Asian Experience, Beijing, pp. 52–82.

IV.  Selected articles in International Journals:
 Pande, Rekha, 2019, Globalisation and Women's work in the Beedi Industry, Studia Historiae Oeconomicae, The Journal of Adam Mickiewicz University, Volume 37: Issue 1, pp. 191–221. DOI: 10.2478/sho-2019-0010
 Pande, Rekha (with Pooja Chetry), 2019, Gender Bias and the Sex Trafficking Interventions in the Eastern Border of India–Nepal, South Asian Survey, August 8.
 Pande, Rekha (with Niharika Joshi), 2019, Representation of Women in Garhwal Miniature Paintings Ars Artium, An International Peer Reviewed-cum-Refereed Research Journal of English Studies and Culture, Volume 7, January, pp. 122–139.  ISSN (Online) : 2395-2423 ISSN (Print) : 2319–7889.
 Pande, Rekha, 2018, Married to God: The Jogin system in India, Pakistan Journal of Women’s studies, Alam e- Niswan, Vol. 25, No.2, pp. 19–35. ISSN No. 1024-1256.
 Pande, Rekha, 2018,  An odyssey with an international feminist journal, International Feminist Journal of Politics Vol. 20, No. 4, Routledge, Taylor and Francis, pp. 486–491. DOI: 10.1080/14616742.2018.1536380
 Pande, Rekha, 2018, The History of Feminism and Doing Gender in India, vol.26 no.3 'Revista  Estudos Feministas, Florianópolis, Brazil, ISSN 0104-026XOn-line version ISSN 1806-9584.
 Pande, Rekha, 2015, Widows of Vrindavan- Feminization of old age in India, Pakistan Journal of Gender Studies, Vol. X, Centre of excellence for Women's Studies, University of Karachi, Karachi, Pakistan, pp. 209–223.
 Pande, Rekha (with Meenal Tula), 2014, Re-Inscribing the Indian Courtesan: A Genealogical Approach", Journal of International Women's Studies" USA, Volume 15, Issue 1, pp. 67–82.
 Pande, Rekha, 2013, "When devotion opened gendered spaces: Journey through the terrain of Bhakti, 13th to 17th Centuries, Hieron, Studies in Comparative Religion, special issue on, Indian Religions across time and space, Vol. 2, No. XI, Department of Comparative Religion, Comenius University, Brastislava, pp.33-47. (ISBN 978-80 -89027-39-2).
 Pande, Rekha, 2007," Local and Global Encounters-Gender, poverty and Globalization in India", Development, Journal of Society for International Development, Volume, 50, No. 2, Palgrave Macmillan Ltd., Houndmills, Basingstoke, Hampshire, England, pp. 134–140.
 Pande, Rekha, 2006, Gender Concerns in rural settlement-looking at sustainable agriculture, Journal of Development Alternatives and Area study, San Antonio, Texas, USA,  Vol. 25, No.3, September, pp. 63–86.
 Pande, Rekha, 2005, Looking at Information Technology from a gender perspective: The call centers in India, Asian Journal of Women's Studies, Republic of Korea, Vol11, No.1, pp. 58–82.
 Pande, Rekha, 2004, The girl child in India, in Review of Women's Studies, Vol.XIV, No.2, July–December, Philippines,  pp. 149–173.
 Pande, Rekha, 2004, The politics of dance in Pakistan- a conversation with Seema Kermani, Classical dancer in Pakistan, International Feminist Journal of Politics, Vol.VI, No.3, pp. 508–514.
 Pande, Rekha,2002, The public face of a private domestic violence, International Feminist Journal of Politics, Rutledge, U.K. Vol. 4, No. 3, pp. 342–367.
 Pande, Rekha,2001, The Social costs of Globalization : Restructuring Developing World Economies, Journal of Asian Women's Studies, Vol. 10, December, Kitakyushu Forum, Japan. pp. 1–14.
 Pande, Rekha, 2000, Globalization and women in the agricultural sector, International Feminist Journal of Politics, Rutledge, U.K. Vol. 2, No. 1, pp. 409–412.

References 

Indian feminists
Academic staff of the University of Hyderabad
1955 births
University of Allahabad alumni
Academic staff of the University of Allahabad
Living people